The Shipconstructors' and Shipwrights' Association (SSA) was a trade union representing shipbuilders in the United Kingdom.

History
The union was founded in 1882 as the Associated Society of Shipwrights, by eleven local unions in Scotland and North East England.  Seven further unions in Scotland and North West England quickly joined the new association.  The union changed its name to the Associated Shipwrights' Society, and gradually other unions around the UK affiliated.

In 1908, the union merged with the Ship Constructive Association and the Amalgamated Society of Drillers and Hole Cutters, and renamed itself as the Ship Constructive and Shipwrights' Association, later changing this to the "Shipconstructors' and Shipwrights' Association".  At the beginning of 1963, it merged with the United Society of Boilermakers, Shipbuilders and Structural Workers.

Election results
The union sponsored Labour Party candidates in several Parliamentary elections.

General Secretaries
1882: Alexander Wilkie
1928: Frank Purdy (acting)
1929: William Westwood
1945: John Willcocks
1948: Sydney Ombler
1958: Arthur Williams

References

Further reading
 Dougan, David The shipwrights: a history of the Shipconstructors' and Shipwrights' Association, 1882–1963. Newcastle upon Tyne: Graham, 1975. .

External links
Catalogue of the Association archives, held at the Modern Records Centre, University of Warwick

Defunct trade unions of the United Kingdom
1882 establishments in the United Kingdom
Shipbuilding trade unions
Craft unions
Trade unions established in 1882
Trade unions disestablished in 1963
Trade unions based in Tyne and Wear